The 2022 Philippine House of Representatives elections in Metro Manila were held on May 9, 2022, to elect the thirty-three representatives to the House of Representatives of the Philippines representing various areas in the National Capital Region. The elections coincided with the presidential election, the senatorial election, and the local elections. The representatives were elected via first past the post, in which the candidate with the most votes will be elected as representative for that district.

Caloocan's 3rd congressional district was used for the first time in this election.

Summary

Caloocan

1st District

Incumbent Dale Gonzalo Malapitan was on his second term and was eligible to run for the same post, but opted to run for Mayor, switching posts with his father, Oscar Malapitan. Oscar faced his former ally, councilor Alou Nubla, as well as Independent Violy dela Cruz.

2nd District

Edgar Erice was on his third and final term and ran for Mayor. His party nominated Jacob Cabochan. Cabochan faced four other candidates, namely Vice Mayor Luis Macario Asistio, former representative Mary Mitzi Cajayon, and councilors Roberto Samson and Alexander Mangasar.

3rd District

This will be the first election to be held in the 3rd district since its creation in 2021. It will be contested between former Mayor Enrico Echiverri and 1st district councilor Dean Asistio.

Las Piñas

Incumbent Rep. Camille Villar faced Felipe Garduque II, and Atty. Luisito "Louie" Redoble.

Makati

1st District
Romulo "Kid" Peña Jr. was the incumbent. His opponents were independent candidates Minnie Antonio and Ferdinand Sevilla.

2nd District
Luis Jose Angel Campos Jr. was the incumbent. His opponent was independent candidate Ricardo Opoc.

Malabon
Josephine Veronique Lacson-Noel was the incumbent. Her opponent was former representative Federico Sandoval.

Mandaluyong

Incumbent Neptali Gonzales II ran for reelection.

Manila

1st District

Manny Lopez was the incumbent. His opponents were Councilor Ernesto "Ernix" Dionisio Jr. and former Congressman Benjamin "Atong" Asilo.

2nd District

Rolan Valeriano was the incumbent and ran with the local party Asenso Manileño. His opponent was former Congressman Carlo Lopez.

3rd District

Incumbent Yul Servo did not seek reelection to run for Vice Mayor. His party's nominee was incumbent city majority floor leader and Councilor Joel Chua. His opponents were former Councilor and incumbent Barangay 299 Captain Ramon Morales and Clark Field Arroño III.

4th District

Edward Maceda was the incumbent and ran with the local party Asenso Manileño. His opponents were former Congresswoman Trisha Bonoan-David and Christopher Gabriel, both happened to be his challengers in 2019.

5th District

Amanda Cristina "Cristal" Bagatsing was the incumbent and ran with the local party KABAKA. Her opponent was Councilor Irwin Tieng.

6th District

Benny Abante was the incumbentand ran with the local party Asenso Manileño. His opponents were Romualdo "Bal" Billanes and Antonio Sityar II.

Marikina

1st District

The incumbent representative was Bayani Fernando, who was re-elected in 2019 with 80.46% of the vote. Fernando was eligible for re-election but has opted to run for Mayor.

Former vice mayor and 2019 candidate Jose Fabian Cadiz was initially nominated by the Nationalist People's Coalition to run in Fernando's place. However, Cadiz died on February 20, 2022, less than three months before the election. His party nominated his nephew, Jose Miguel Cadiz to run in his place.

2nd District

The incumbent representative was Stella Quimbo, who was elected in 2019 with 83.74% of the vote. Quimbo's main opponent was the 11th mayor of Marikina and former congressman Del De Guzman.

Muntinlupa

Incumbent Ruffy Biazon, who ran under PDP–Laban and won in 2019, ran for Mayor under One Muntinlupa (and won). Running for the position were incumbent three-term Mayor Jaime Fresnedi (Liberal/One Muntinlupa) and Silverio Garing (PDP–Laban).

Navotas
Incumbent Representative John Rey Tiangco ran for Mayor. His brother, incumbent Mayor Toby Tiangco, was his party's nominee.

Parañaque

1st District

Incumbent Eric Olivarez was term-limited and ran for Mayor, switching places with his brother, incumbent Mayor Edwin Olivarez.

2nd District

Incumbent Joy Myra Tambunting was not running. Her husband, former representative Gustavo Tambunting was her party's nominee.

Pasay
Incumbent Representative Antonino "Tony" Calixto will seek for second term. He faced Efren "Choy" Alas, Jocelyn Sato, and independent Ramon Yabut.

Pasig
Incumbent Roman Romulo ran for reelection.

Quezon City

1st District

Incumbent Anthony Peter Crisologo ran for reelection. His opponents were actor Arjo Atayde and MSME Entrepreneur Marcus Aurelius Dee. Among the three running, Marcus Aurelius Dee was the only native of District 1.

2nd District

Incumbent Precious Hipolito-Castelo ran for reelection. She faced five other candidates, including Ralph Tulfo, the son of broadcaster and senatorial candidate Raffy Tulfo.

3rd District

Allan Benedict Reyes was the incumbent.

4th District

Bong Suntay was the incumbent.

5th District

Alfred Vargas was on his third term as representative and was barred to seek reelection. Instead, he ran as councilor and his party nominated his brother, incumbent councilor PM Vargas. Other notable candidates were Rose Lin and former 2nd district representative Mary Ann Susano. Lin was originally nominated by Lakas–CMD but she later resigned from the party on November 19, 2021.

6th District

Kit Belmonte was on his third term as representative and was barred to seek reelection. His coalition nominated incumbent councilor Marivic Co-Pilar. She faced former 1st District representative and defeated mayoralty candidate Vincent Crisologo and Tricia Nicole Velasco-Catera.

San Juan

Incumbent Ronaldo Zamora was term-limited. His daughter, Bel was his party's nominee. Her opponent was former councilor Jana Ejercito.

Taguig and Pateros

1st District of Taguig and Pateros

Incumbent Congressman and former House Speaker Alan Peter Cayetano has opted to run for senator. Competing in his place were term-limited incumbent Vice mayor Ricardo Cruz Jr. and 2019 candidate Allan Cerafica.

2nd District of Taguig

Incumbent Congresswoman Lani Cayetano has opted to run for mayor of Taguig. Competing in her place were term-limited incumbent councilor Pammy Zamora and former councilor and 2019 candidate Michelle Anne Gonzales.

Valenzuela

1st District
Incumbent Wes Gatchalian ran for Mayor, switching places with his brother, incumbent Mayor Rex Gatchalian who ran unopposed.

2nd District
Incumbent Eric Martinez ran for reelection. His opponent was former representative Magtanggol Gunigundo.

References

2022 Philippine general election
Lower house elections in Metro Manila
May 2022 events in the Philippines